The genus Cousinia of the tribe Cardueae is in its current circumscription one of the larger genera in the Asteraceae, with approximately 650-700 species distributed in central and western Asia.

Many of the species in this genus were once classified in genus Arctium (the burdocks).

Species

References

External links 
  USDA GRIN
  Mehregan, I. & Kadereit, J. W.: Taxonomic revision of Cousinia sect. Cynaroideae (Asteraceae, Cardueae). Willdenowia 38: 293-362.

Cynareae
Asteraceae genera